Genghis Khan is a 1998 Chinese film directed by Sai Fu and Mai Lisi, produced by Inner Mongolia Film Studio.

Cast and roles
 Ai Liya as Hoelun
 Tumen as Genghis Khan

Awards and nominations
 The film was selected as the Chinese entry for the Best Foreign Language Film at the 71st Academy Awards, but was not accepted as a nominee.
 5th Beijing College Student Film Festival: Jury Award for Best Actress - Ai Liya
 Changchun Film Festival: Golden Deer Award for Best Actress - Ai Liya
 Golden Phoenix Award: Society Award
 Shanghai International Film Festival: Golden Goblet Award for Best Actress - Ai Liya
 Golden Rooster Award for Best Actress: Ai Liya - Nominated

See also
 List of submissions to the 71st Academy Awards for Best Foreign Language Film
 List of Chinese submissions for the Academy Award for Best Foreign Language Film

References

External links
 
 reelzchannel entry

1998 films
1990s Mandarin-language films
Mongolian-language films
Chinese epic films
1998 drama films
Depictions of Genghis Khan on film
Films set in the 12th century
Films set in the 13th century
Films set in the Mongol Empire
Films set in Mongolia
Chinese historical films
1990s historical films